Jagdeep Dhankhar (born 18 May 1951) is an Indian politician and lawyer who is serving as the 14th and current Vice President of the Republic of India since 2022.He also served as the Governor of West Bengal from 2019 to 2022. He served as the Union Minister for Parliamentary Affairs under the Chandra Shekhar ministry from 1990 to 1991.He was a member of Rajasthan Legislative Assembly from 1993 to 1998.Dhankar was a member of Lok Sabha from 1989 to 1991. He is a member of the Bharatiya Janata Party. He has also been a member of Janata Dal and Indian National Congress in the past.

Early life and education 
Dhankhar the current vice president of India was born on 18 May 1951, in Kithana, a small village in the Jhunjhunu district of Rajasthan, India into a Hindu Jat family to parents Gokal Chand and Kesari Devi. He completed his school education from Sainik School, Chittorgarh and then graduated in B.Sc and LLB from the University of Rajasthan, Jaipur. Dhankhar completed his primary and middle school education from Kithana Government School and Ghardhana Government School respectively.

Dhankhar married Sudesh Dhankhar in 1979, and they have a daughter, Kamna.

Law career 

Dhankhar enrolled with the Bar Council of Rajasthan as an Advocate in 1979. He was designated as Senior Advocate by the High Court of Judicature for Rajasthan in 1990, and was the senior-most designated Senior Advocate of the state till taking the oath as Governor on 30 July 2019.

Since 1990, Dhankhar had been practicing primarily in the Supreme Court of India. He has appeared in various High Courts of India. He is a former President of Rajasthan High Court Bar Association, Jaipur.

Dhankhar had appeared in the Sutlej River water dispute in 2016, he argued on behalf of the state of Haryana in the Supreme Court of India.

Political career 
He has been a member of Janata Dal and Indian National Congress in past.
He was a member of parliament of Janata Dal representing Jhunjhunu Lok Sabha constituency in Rajasthan during 1989–91 in the 9th Lok Sabha.

He joined Congress in 1991. He lost the 1991 Indian general election from Ajmer Lok Sabha constituency. He was elected as a Member of Legislative Assembly (MLA) from Kishangarh, Rajasthan during 1993–98 in the 10th Legislative Assembly Rajasthan.

He lost the 1998 Indian general election from Jhunjhunu Lok Sabha constituency and came on third position.

He joined the BJP in 2003. He was a member of 2008 assembly election campaign committee of BJP. In 2016, he  headed the BJP's law and legal affairs department.

Governor of West Bengal (2019 - 2022)

On 20 July 2019, Second Modi ministry through, President  Ram Nath Kovind appointed him as Governor of West Bengal. T. B. Radhakrishnan, Chief Justice of the Calcutta High Court administered the Oath of Office to Jagdeep Dhankhar on 30 July 2019 at the Raj Bhavan, Kolkata

After becoming the governor of West Bengal, Dhankhar had frequent public confrontations with the state government and chief minister of the state Mamata Banerjee throughout his tenure. Dhankhar had been a vocal critic of the Third Banerjee ministry, and frequently used Twitter and media to attack the West Bengal government over political issues. In response the ruling party in Bengal All India Trinamool Congress (AITC) referred Dhankhar as the 'real leader of the opposition'. In January 2022, CM Banerjee blocked Dhankhar on Twitter and accused him of mentioning her in his tweets daily and speaking in an unethical and abusive way.

The Hindu, newspaper in its editorial noted that it appeared on several occasions that "Dhankhar was playing a partisan role in State politics, in tandem with the BJP".

On 13 July 2022, Dhankar met with Chief Minister of West Bengal Mamata Banerjee and Chief Minister of Assam Himanta Biswa Sharma. Later on 15 July 2022, Dhankar visited Delhi and met Union Home Minister Amit Shah there. He resigned as Governor on 17 July 2022, after being nominated as the vice-presidential candidate of the National Democratic Alliance. Reacting to the nomination, AITC Lok Sabha MP Sougata Roy, said that Dhankhar was "being rewarded for harassing the AITC".

Vice Presidency (2022–present)

2022 vice-presidential election 

On 16 July 2022, the BJP nominated Dhankhar as the National Democratic Alliance's candidate for Vice President of India for the 2022 election the following month. Dhankhar has been projected as a kisan putra (farmer's son) by the BJP. He contested against the United Opposition's candidate, Margaret Alva, a former Union Minister and Governor from the Indian National Congress. On 18 July 2022, Dhankhar filed his nomination papers for the Vice-president elections. He was accompanied by Prime Minister Narendra Modi and several other union ministers and BJP politicians.

The elections were conducted on 6 August, and the same evening counting of votes were carried out. Dhankhar emerged victorious by securing 528 votes out of the 725 MP votes from the lower and upper houses polled. All India Trinamool Congress abstained from the election with only two members voting.

Dhankhar won the 2022 election with 74.37% votes and recorded a highest poll-victory margin since the 1992 election.

Tenure 

Dhankar assumed the office on 11 August 2022 succeeding Venkaiah Naidu, with the oath administered by the President of India, Droupadi Murmu in the central banquet hall of the Rashtrapati Bhavan.

Electoral performance

See also
List of governors of West Bengal
2022 Indian vice presidential election

References

 
|-

|-

|-

|-

  
 

1951 births
Bharatiya Janata Party politicians from Rajasthan
Indian Senior Counsel
People from Jhunjhunu district
Governors of West Bengal
Lok Sabha members from Rajasthan
India MPs 1989–1991
Living people
Janata Dal politicians
Indian National Congress politicians from Rajasthan
Rajasthan MLAs 1993–1998